The SuperVia network in Rio de Janeiro, Brazil is made up of 102 stations across eight rail lines and one cable car line.

Current stations

Current system map

References

SuperVia stations
SuperVia